Charles Maurice Haid III (born June 2, 1943) is an American actor and television director, with notable work in both movies and television. He is best known for his portrayal of Officer Andy Renko in Hill Street Blues.

Haid was born in San Francisco, the son of Grace Marian (née Folger) and Charles Maurice Haid Jr. He attended Carnegie Institute of Technology (now Carnegie Mellon University), where he met Steven Bochco. He was associate producer of the original stage production of Godspell in 1971, which was developed at CMU.

Haid's acting credits include the 1976/1977 series Delvecchio as Sgt. Paul Schonski, the 1980s series Hill Street Blues as Officer Andy Renko, and the 1980 movie Altered States as Dr. Mason Parrish. In 1984, Haid was cast as "The Fatman" (or just "Fats") in the never released movie The House of God. 

In 2004–05, he played C.T. Finney, a corrupt New York police captain on the sixth season of the NBC show Third Watch. Haid provided the voice of the one-legged rabbit "Lucky Jack" in the 2004 Disney animated film Home on the Range. Twenty years earlier, Haid had voiced main character "Montgomery Moose" in the pilot episode of The Get Along Gang, produced by Nelvana. He was replaced by Sparky Marcus for the subsequent series.

His directing credits include an episode of ER that earned him a Directors Guild Award and nominations for the TV movie Buffalo Soldiers and an episode of NYPD Blue. He was a regular director on the FX series Nip/Tuck. He also directed for the FX series Sons of Anarchy and AMC's Breaking Bad. He was a regular director for the CBS series Criminal Minds, for which he also portrayed serial killer Randall Garner (a.k.a. "The Fisher King").

Selected filmography

 Gunsmoke - “Like Old Times” (1974) as Hargis
 Harry O - "The Admiral's Lady" (1974) as Sgt. Garvey
 The Execution of Private Slovik (1974, TV movie) as Brockmeyer
 Alex & the Gypsy (1976) as Second Goon
 The Choirboys (1977) as Nick Yanov
 A Death in Canaan (1978, TV movie) as Sgt. Case
 The Bastard (1978, TV movie) as George Lumden
 Who'll Stop the Rain (1978) as Eddie Peace
 Deathmoon (1978) as Earl Wheelie
 Oliver's Story (1978) as Stephen Simpson
 The New Adventures of Wonder Woman - "The Girl with a Gift for Disaster" (1979) as Bob Baker
 Altered States (1980) as Mason Parrish
 Pray TV (1980) as Buck Sunday
 Twirl (1981, TV movie) as Matt Jordan
 Hill Street Blues (1981-87) as Officer Andy Renko (main character)
 The House of God (1984) as Fats (The Fatman)
 Six Against the Rock (1987, TV movie) as Sam Shockley
 Weekend War (1988, TV movie) as Sgt. Kupjack
 Cop (1988) - Delbert 'Whitey' Haines
 The Rescue (1988) as Cmdr. Howard
 The Great Escape II: The Untold Story (1988, TV movie) as Sgt. MacKenzie
 The Revenge of Al Capone (1989, TV movie) as Alex Connors
 Fire and Rain (1989, TV movie as Bob Sonnamaker)
 Nightbreed (1990) as Captain Eigerman
 The Dreamer of Oz: The L. Frank Baum Story (1990, TV movie) as Al Badham / Cowardly Lion
 Storyville (1992) as Abe Choate
 Iron Will (1994) (director only)
 NYPD Blue - “Good Time Charlie” (1994) as Charlie
 Home on the Range (2004) as Lucky Jack (voice)
 Sensitivity Training (2016) as Glenn

References

External links

1943 births
Male actors from California
American male film actors
American male television actors
American television directors
Living people
Palo Alto High School alumni
Male actors from San Francisco
Carnegie Mellon University College of Fine Arts alumni
Directors Guild of America Award winners